Latin music is a genre in the music industry. Conventionally, it encompasses all music with lyrics in Spanish or Portuguese, as well as various styles of music from Ibero-America.

Latin music may also refer to:

 Music of Latin America, often shortened as "Latin music"
 Songs with Latin lyrics:
 Church music, compositions for churches written in Latin
 Music of ancient Rome, the musical traditions of ancient Rome